The Hundredth Bride 《第一百个新娘》 is a 1980 Chinese-language western-style opera by Wang Shiguang and Cai Kexiang. The opera is set in Uygur areas. Songs from the opera were distributed using the jianpu Chinese numbered musical notation making selections from the opera more widely known.

References

Chinese western-style operas
Operas
1980 operas
Xinjiang in fiction